Joseph Fletcher Anderson Jr. (born November 16, 1949) is a senior United States district judge of the United States District Court for the District of South Carolina.

Education and career

Anderson was born in Augusta, Georgia. He received a Bachelor of Arts degree in political science from Clemson University in 1972, where he was a member of Sigma Nu fraternity. He received a Juris Doctor from the University of South Carolina School of Law in 1975. He was a law clerk for Judge Clement Haynsworth of the United States Court of Appeals for the Fourth Circuit from 1975 to 1976. He was in private practice in Edgefield from 1976 to 1986. He was a Member of the South Carolina House of Representatives from 1980 to 1986. Additionally, he served in the U.S. Army Reserves from 1972-1978.

Federal judicial service

Anderson was nominated by President Ronald Reagan on September 26, 1986, to a seat on the United States District Court for the District of South Carolina vacated by Judge Charles Earl Simons Jr. He was confirmed by the United States Senate on October 8, 1986, and received his commission on October 14, 1986. Anderson was the youngest federal judge in South Carolina history at the time of his appointment. He served as Chief Judge from 2000 to 2007. He assumed senior status on November 16, 2014.

Honorary degree

At Clemson's December 2009 graduation, Anderson received an honorary Legum Doctor (Doctor of Laws).

References

Sources
 "Acclaimed Federal Judge". Clemson World. Spring 2010. Clemson, South Carolina: Clemson University. 27.
 

1949 births
Living people
20th-century American judges
21st-century American judges
People from Augusta, Georgia
Clemson University alumni
People from Edgefield, South Carolina
University of South Carolina alumni
Members of the South Carolina House of Representatives
Judges of the United States District Court for the District of South Carolina
United States district court judges appointed by Ronald Reagan